Francisco Morazán, FMO  is one of the departments of Honduras.

It is located in the central part of the nation. The departmental capital is Tegucigalpa, which is also Honduras's national capital. Until 1943 it was known as Tegucigalpa department. It was named after national hero Francisco Morazán.

The department is very mountainous, with rugged ranges covered in pine forests; which are rocky and mostly clay. Valleys, like those of Guaimaca, Talanga, and Amarateca, are interspersed among the ranges. Many of the high mountain peaks house cloud forests, like La Tigra National park or Cerro Uyuca. The extreme southeastern portion of the department has a Pacific dry forest environment, while the northern portion contains the Montaña de la Flor, home to the Jicaque people.

The coat-of-arms and department flag of Francisco Morazán Department are the same as its capital, Tegucigalpa.

Municipalities

 Alubarén
 Cedros
 Curarén
 Distrito Central (cap. Tegucigalpa)
 El Porvenir
 Guaimaca
 La Libertad
 La Venta
 Lepaterique
 Maraita
 Marale
 Nueva Armenia
 Ojojona
 Orica
 Reitoca
 Sabanagrande
 San Antonio de Oriente
 San Buenaventura
 San Ignacio
 San Juan de Flores
 San Miguelito
 Santa Ana
 Santa Lucía
 Talanga
 Tatumbla
 Valle de Ángeles
 Vallecillo
 Villa de San Francisco

See also
 Arnoldo José Avilés García

Notes

References

 
Departments of Honduras